The 1971–72 international cricket season was from September 1971 to April 1972.

Season overview

November

World XI in Australia

February

New Zealand in the West Indies

References

International cricket competitions by season
1971 in cricket
1972 in cricket